Angela Gallimore is a former England women's international footballer.   She competed at the 1984 European Competition for Women's Football where England lost against Sweden.

References

Living people
FA Women's National League players
English women's footballers
England women's international footballers
Women's association football defenders
Year of birth missing (living people)
Liverpool F.C. Women players
Liverpool L.F.C. managers
English women's football managers
Association football player-managers